Denis Viane (born 2 October 1977 in Bruges) is a Belgian former footballer. He usually played as defender (central or full-back), although he could also play as a midfielder.

Denis began his career at VKSO Zerkegem. In 1990, he signed for Cercle Brugge. He made his debut on 15 October 1997, in a home defeat in a cup match against Exc. Mouscron.  He was captain of the team from 2001 until July 2007, when new Cercle Brugge manager Glen De Boeck named Jimmy De Wulf as captain.

In 2004, Denis lost his girlfriend Nele, who died of leukemia. The team was cut up by her death, managing only to get 2 points out of the following 9 matches.

After being rather unsure of a place in the starting eleven in the 2006–07 season, Viane took his position back in 2007–08, forcing a.o. team captain Jimmy De Wulf to the bench.

References

 Denis Viane player info at the official Cercle Brugge site 
 Cerclemuseum.be 

1977 births
Living people
Footballers from Bruges
Belgian footballers
Cercle Brugge K.S.V. players
Royal Antwerp F.C. players
Association football defenders
Belgian Pro League players
Challenger Pro League players